Earl Gilbert "Bud" Svendsen (February 7, 1915 – August 6, 1996) was a professional American football player who played center and linebacker for six seasons for the Green Bay Packers and the Brooklyn Dodgers of the National Football League (NFL).  He was inducted into the Green Bay Packers Hall of Fame in 1985.

Drafted fourth by the Packers in 1937, Bud Svendsen joined his brother George in Green Bay that year. In 1938, he left to coach Northeast Missouri State College (now Truman State University) in Kirksville for a season. The 6’1”, 195-pound Svendsen, a center and linebacker, returned to play in the 1939 season including the '39 championship victory over the New York Giants.

Svendsen, a University of Minnesota star, scored a touchdown against the Brooklyn Dodgers in 1939 and picked off a Len Barnum pass in the ‘39 championship game, played at State Fair Park in Milwaukee.

After his playing career ended, he worked as an assistant coach at the University of Minnesota, University of Connecticut, Lafayette College, and Northwestern University. He also served as the head coach at Hamilton College from 1946 to 1948.

References

External links
 
 

1915 births
1996 deaths
American football centers
American football linebackers
Brooklyn Dodgers (NFL) players
Green Bay Packers players
Hamilton Continentals football coaches
Lafayette Leopards football coaches
Minnesota Golden Gophers football coaches
Minnesota Golden Gophers football players
Northwestern Wildcats football coaches
Truman Bulldogs football coaches
UConn Huskies football coaches
Sports coaches from Minneapolis
Coaches of American football from Minnesota
Players of American football from Minneapolis
American people of Norwegian descent